Ann Stanford (November 25, 1916 – July 12, 1987) was an American poet.

Early life and education

Ann Stanford was born in La Habra, California and attended Stanford University where she graduated in 1938 Phi Beta Kappa, and University of California, Los Angeles, with an M.A. in journalism in 1958, an M.A. in English in 1961, and a Ph.D. in English and American literature in 1962.

Personal life
Stanford married Roland Arthur White, an architect, in 1942, and they had three daughters and one son. Her oldest daughter is Academy Award nominated costume designer Rosanna Norton.

Career

When she died in 1987, at the age of seventy, Ann Stanford was at the apex of a long and distinguished career as a poet, translator, editor, scholar and teacher. Over a period of forty years, she had written eight volumes of poetry, two verse plays, and a book-length study of the Puritan poet Anne Bradstreet. She had also translated the classic Sanskrit text The Bhagavad Gita and edited The Women Poets in English, an anthology that gathered, for the first time, hundreds of years of poetry by women.  Her poems had appeared regularly in the most prestigious journals and magazines—the New Yorker, The Atlantic, Poetry, The New Republic, The Southern Review—and had been widely honored.

From 1962 to 1987, she taught at California State University, Northridge.

She was a founding member of the Associated Writing Programs. 
Since 1988, a poetry prize has been awarded in her name.

Awards
 Two National Endowment for the Arts Fellowships in Poetry
 Pushcart Prize
 National Institute of Arts and Letters Award for Literature
 DiCastagnola Award for Poetry
 1968/1969 Shelley Memorial Award

Works
Twelve Poets of the Pacific (edited by Yvor Winters; New Directions, 1937)
In Narrow Bound (Alan Swallow, 1943)
The White Bird (Alan Swallow, 1949)
The Weathercock (The Viking Press, 1966)
The Descent (The Viking Press, 1970)
Climbing Up to Light (The Magpie Press, 1973)
In Mediterranean Air (The Viking Press, 1977)
Dreaming the Garden (Cahuenga Press, 2000)
Holding Our Own: The Selected Poems of Ann Stanford (edited by Maxine Scates and David Trinidad; Copper Canyon Press, 2001)

Verse plays
Magellan: A Poem to Be Read by Several Voices (Talisman Press, 1958)
The Countess of Forlì (Orirana Press, 1985)

Translation
The Bhagavad Gita: A New Verse Translation (Herder and Herder, 1970)

Editor
The Women Poets in English (McGraw-Hill, 1972)
Critical Essays on Anne Bradstreet (with Pattie Cowell; G.K. Hall, 1983)

Criticism
Anne Bradstreet, the Worldly Puritan: An Introduction to Her Poetry (Burt Franklin, 1974)

References

1916 births
1987 deaths
Poets from California
20th-century American poets
Stanford University alumni
University of California, Los Angeles alumni
California State University, Northridge faculty
People from La Habra, California
American women poets
20th-century American women writers